Tét is a town in Győr-Moson-Sopron county, Hungary. It is located between the town of Pápa (21 km north) and the city of Győr (24 km south) in the Little Hungarian Plain. According to 1990 census it used to have 4,252 inhabitants, nearly all of them Hungarian by ethnicity. Neighbouring settlements are: Rábaszentmihály, Kisbabot, Rábaszentmiklós, Mórichida, Gyömöre, Felpéc, Győrszemere and the city of Győr.

History
In 1910 Tét was a village in the Sokoróalja district of the Győr County with 4,111 inhabitants. In terms of religion: 1,935 citizens (47,1%) were Lutheran, 1,890 (46,0%) Roman Catholic, 432 (10,5%) Jewish and 52 (1,3%) others. Tét population grew steadily in the interwar period. Notably, the Jews of Tét were forced into a transit ghetto and then sent aboard Holocaust trains to the Auschwitz concentration camp during the Holocaust. They are featured in the Auschwitz Album, the only surviving pictorial evidence of the extermination process from inside Birkenau.

Tét received town rights (Város) in 2001. Current population is estimated at 4,104 inhabitants.

Notable people 
 Károly Kisfaludy (1788–1830) a Hungarian dramatist and artist.
 Gábor Faludi (1846–1932) a theatre manager in Budapest

Gallery

References

External links

  in Hungarian

Populated places in Győr-Moson-Sopron County